Lorato Venus Blennies is a South African politician who has been the Member of the Executive Council (MEC) for Youth, Women, Disability, Communication and E-Government of the Northern Cape and a Member of the Northern Cape Provincial Legislature since October 2022. Blennies is a member of the African National Congress.

Career
Blennies is a member of the African National Congress as well as a senior member of the party's youth wing, the African National Congress Youth League. In September 2022, Blennies and two other ANC Youth League officials, Khulekani Mondli Skhosana and Stella Mondlane, had been given permission by the Russian government to be election observers of the internationally condemned referendums Russia held in occupied territories of Eastern Ukraine asking citizens if they want their regions to be annexed into Russia.  Blennies said in an interview with a Russian journalist that she had spoken to voters in the Donetsk Oblast and they told her: "This is a moment they have always been waiting for. Some of them have stated that it’s been about eight years of waiting for this moment." 

The Democratic Alliance Shadow Minister for International Relations and Co-Operation Darren Bergman condemned Blennies and the two other ANC Youth League representatives and wrote to the Minister of Internal Affairs of Ukraine, Denys Monastyrsky, calling on him to declare Blennies and the other two as "undesirable persons" so that they could be removed from the Donbass region, which is internationally still considered Ukrainian territory.

Northern Cape Provincial Government
On 18 October 2022, Blennies was sworn in as a member of the Northern Cape Provincial Legislature for the ANC. She replaced David Dichaba who resigned. On 26 October 2022, premier Zamani Saul reconstituted his executive council and announced that Blennies had been appointed the Member of the Executive Council (MEC) for the newly created Youth, Women, Disability, Communication and E-Government portfolio.

References

External links

Living people
African National Congress politicians
Members of the Northern Cape Provincial Legislature
People from the Northern Cape
South African women in politics
Year of birth missing (living people)